Nerita albicilla, common name the blotched nerite, is a species of sea snail, a marine gastropod mollusk in the family Neritidae.

Description
N. albicilla grows up to 4 cm; its shell surface is smooth or with slight transverse ridges; it has small pustules and four weak teeth on the columella. Its outer shell color is variegated black and white, occasionally with three conspicuous bands. The interior is white, with a pinkish-grey, granular operculum.

Distribution
Tropical Indo-Pacific

 Aldabra
 Australia (Kalk, 1958)
 Chagos
 East Coast of South Africa
 Kenya
 Madagascar
 Mascarene Basin
 Mauritius
 Mozambique
 Red Sea
 Seychelles
 Tanzania

Habitat 
It is found on rocky cliffs, on rocks in the littoral fringe, and sometimes on mangrove trees.

Parasites 
 Vibrio parahaemolyticus

References
This article incorporates CC-BY-SA-3.0 work from the reference.

 Kilburn, R.N. & Rippey, E. (1982) Sea Shells of Southern Africa. Macmillan South Africa, Johannesburg, xi + 249 pp
 Drivas, J. & Jay, M. (1987). Coquillages de La Réunion et de l'Île Maurice. Collection Les Beautés de la Nature. Delachaux et Niestlé: Neuchâtel. ISBN 2-603-00654-1. 159 pp
 Blackmore, G. (1998). The importance of feeding ecology in investigating accumulated heavy metal body burdens in Thais clavigera (Kuster) (mollusca: neogastropoda: muricidae) in Hong Kong. PhD thesis. The University of Hong Kong
 Steyn, D.G. & Lussi, M. (1998) Marine Shells of South Africa. An Illustrated Collector's Guide to Beached Shells. Ekogilde Publishers, Hartebeespoort, South Africa, ii + 264 pp.
 Jarrett, A.G. (2000) Marine Shells of the Seychelles. Carole Green Publishing, Cambridge, xiv + 149 pp. NIZT 682
 Liu, J.Y. [Ruiyu] (ed.). (2008). Checklist of marine biota of China seas. China Science Press. 1267 pp.
 Fowler, O. (2016). Seashells of the Kenya coast. ConchBooks: Harxheim. Pp. 1–170.

External links
 Linnaeus, C. (1758). Systema Naturae per regna tria naturae, secundum classes, ordines, genera, species, cum characteribus, differentiis, synonymis, locis. Editio decima, reformata [10th revised edition, vol. 1: 824 pp. Laurentius Salvius: Holmiae]
 Röding, P.F. (1798). Museum Boltenianum sive Catalogus cimeliorum e tribus regnis naturæ quæ olim collegerat Joa. Fried Bolten, M. D. p. d. per XL. annos proto physicus Hamburgensis. Pars secunda continens Conchylia sive Testacea univalvia, bivalvia & multivalvia. Trapp, Hamburg. viii, 199 pp.
 Philippi, R. A. (1842-1850). Abbildungen und Beschreibungen neuer oder wenig gekannter Conchylien unter Mithülfe meherer deutscher Conchyliologen. Cassel, T. Fischer
 Issel, A. (1865). Catalogo dei molluschi raccolti dalla missione italiana in Persia aggiuntavi la descrizione delle specie nuove o poco note. Stamperia Reale, Torino, 55 pp.
 Branch, G. M. (2002). Two Oceans. 5th impression. David Philip, Cate Town & Johannesburg

Neritidae
Gastropods described in 1758
Taxa named by Carl Linnaeus